Adolfo Abdiel Machado (born 14 February 1985) is a Panamanian professional footballer who plays as a defender for Liga FPD club San Carlos.

Club career
Around July 2008 Machado travelled to Colombia to play with Copa Mustang side Envigado along with U-23 teammate Armando Cooper. However the transfer failed and had to return to Panama to continue with Alianza. In December 2008 he was signed by Guatemalan side Deportivo Marquense. In May 2010 he joined Honduran side Marathón and in December 2010 Machado moved to Guatemalan top club Comunicaciones. He would help Comunicaciones win the 2011 Clausura.

Doping case and suspension
In February 2012, Machado, alongside Comunicaciones teammates Fredy Thompson and Marvin Ceballos, was temporarily suspended from playing by FIFA after a positive test on the banned substance boldenone. A second test done at a laboratory in Canada reconfirmed the positive doping test and he was later suspended for two years, until 24 January 2014. Conunicaciones would win the 2012 Apertura and 2013 Clausura in his absence.

Before his ban ended, he signed with San Francisco in November 2013 ahead of the 2014 Clausura season but in December 2013, Machado was loaned to Costa Rican giants Saprissa for two seasons with an option to extend and debuted on the first day after his doping ban was lifted. Machado would help lead Saprissa to 4 titles in his time there and received many personal accolades.

On 21 December 2016, Machado signed with the Houston Dynamo of MLS.  He made his Dynamo debut on 4 March 2017 in a 2–1 over the Seattle Sounders. He helped the Dynamo return to the MLS playoffs for the first time since 2013 Machado played in every minute of the playoffs as the Dynamo reached the western conference finals, where they fell to the Sounders.

The Dynamo didn't have the same league success in the 2018, in part due to Machado missing key games while away on international duty, but he did help the Dynamo win the 2018 US Open Cup, the first in club history.

Machado's contract was not renewed following the 2018 season; he later joined The Strongest.

International career
Machado participated in the 2008 CONCACAF Men's Pre-Olympic Tournament with the Panama U-23 team. He made his debut with the senior team on 1 June 2008 starting in the 1–0 victory over Guatemala. He has, as of 16 October 2018, earned a total of 77 caps, scoring 1 goal. He represented his country at the 2009,  2011 and 2014 UNCAF Nations Cups, with Panama winning the 2009 edition,  as well as at the 2011 CONCACAF Gold Cup.

In May 2018 he was named to Panama's preliminary 35-man squad for the 2018 FIFA World Cup in Russia. The 23-man roster was announced on 30 May with Machado being a part of it. He made his one appearance at the World Cup on 28 June in a 1–2 loss to Tunisia.

Career statistics

International

International goals
Scores and results list Panama's goal tally first.

Honors 

Comunicaciones F.C.
 Liga Nacional de Fútbol de Guatemala: 2011 Clausura

Saprissa
 Liga FPD: Clausura 2014, Apertura 2014, Apertura 2015, Apertura 2016

Houston Dynamo
 US Open Cup: 2018

Alajuelense
 Liga FPD: Apertura 2020
 CONCACAF League: 2020

Panama
 Copa Centroamericana: 2009

Individual
 Rommel Fernández Award (given to best Panamanian footballer abroad): 2014
 Liga FPD Player of the Season: 2014
 Liga FPD Foreign Player of the Season: 2014–15,  2015 Invierno, 2016 Verano, Invierno 2016
 Dynamo defender of the year: 2017

See also
List of sportspeople sanctioned for doping offences

References

External links

1985 births
Living people
Sportspeople from Panama City
Association football defenders
Panamanian footballers
Alianza Panama players
Deportivo Marquense players
C.D. Marathón players
Comunicaciones F.C. players
San Francisco F.C. players
Deportivo Saprissa players
Houston Dynamo FC players
The Strongest players
A.D.R. Jicaral players
L.D. Alajuelense footballers
Liga Panameña de Fútbol players
Liga Nacional de Fútbol Profesional de Honduras players
Liga FPD players
Major League Soccer players
Liga Nacional de Fútbol de Guatemala players
Bolivian Primera División players
Doping cases in association football
Panamanian expatriate footballers
Panama international footballers
2009 UNCAF Nations Cup players
2011 Copa Centroamericana players
2011 CONCACAF Gold Cup players
2014 Copa Centroamericana players
2015 CONCACAF Gold Cup players
2018 FIFA World Cup players
2019 CONCACAF Gold Cup players
Copa América Centenario players
2021 CONCACAF Gold Cup players
Copa Centroamericana-winning players
Expatriate footballers in Honduras
Expatriate footballers in Guatemala
Expatriate footballers in Costa Rica
Expatriate soccer players in the United States
Expatriate footballers in Bolivia
Panamanian expatriate sportspeople in Honduras
Panamanian expatriate sportspeople in Guatemala
Panamanian expatriate sportspeople in Costa Rica
Panamanian expatriate sportspeople in the United States
Panamanian expatriate sportspeople in Bolivia